Maritime Telemedical Assistance Services (TMAS), sometimes referred to as Medico services, because of its radio code, is a medical advice service for seafarers that can provide distant assistance and support through marine radio, e-mail, telephone or fax. In coordination with the local Maritime Rescue Coordination Center (MRCC), TMAS organizations also arrange for medevac to shore, emergency treatment at land facilities and the dispatch of medical personnel to ships with ill mariners.

The rationale for TMAS services is that medical emergencies can occur while many days away from harbor and at prohibitively large distances from Search and Rescue bases, making immediate evacuation impractical or impossible.

The ship's master is responsible for medical treatment at sea, and all commercial ships are required to possess minimal medical supplies. TMAS specialists diagnose cases using non-expert symptom descriptions and advise untrained personnel about emergency treatment given the available supplies and facilities.

All seafaring nations are required by International Labour Organization/International Maritime Organization convention 163 of 1986 to set up a TMAS center that operates 24 hours a day. The center must be staffed by physicians trained in remote consultation and in the peculiarities of shipboard treatment to all civilian ships within their Search and Rescue Region (SRR).

The duties of the TMAS as established by the IAMSAR manual are:

TMAS are established independently by each country, sometimes as independent organisations (such as those of Spain and Italy), sometimes as adjunct units of a major hospital with suitable emergency, trauma and quarantine facilities.

References 

Emergency medical services